Although some lakes occur in mainland Portugal, most of these bodies of water are native to the archipelago of the Azores.
A large part of the lakes present in mainland Portugal are artificial and the result of damming. Most natural lakes in the mainland can be found in Serra da Estrela. Madeira has small bodies of water (ponds), an thus does not meet the criteria for inclusion in this list.

Azores

Corvo Island  
Lagoa do Caldeirão

Flores Island

Lagoa Funda
Lagoa Funda das Lajes 
Lagoa Branca
Lagoa Comprida
Lagoa Negra
Lagoa Seca 
Lagoa da Lomba
Lagoa Rasa

Faial Island
Lagoa da Caldeira
Lagoa das Patas

Pico Island

Lagoa da Prainha
Lagoa do Capitão
Lagoa do Paul
Lagoa Corre Água
Lagoa do Landroal
Lagoa do Caiado
Lagoa Seca
Lagoa dos Grotões
Lagoa da Rosada
Lagoa Negra
Lagoa do Peixinho
Lagoa do Ilhéu
Lagoa do Paúl
Lagoa da Barreira

Graciosa
Lagoa da Vila

Terceira Island

Lagoa Negra
Lagoa do Negro
Chã das Lagoinhas
Lagoa das Patas (ou lagoa da Falca)
Lagoa do Ginjal
Lagoinha
Lagoa Funda
Lagoa do Pico do Alpanaque
Lagoa do Pico do Areeiro
Lagoa do Escampadouro
Lagoa do Junco
Lagoa do Labaçal

São Miguel Island

Lagoa da caldeira das Sete Cidades 
Lagoa de Santiago
Lagoa Rasa
Lagoa do Fogo
Lagoa do Ilhéu de Vila Franca do Campo 
Lagoa das Furnas
Lagoa das Éguas
Lagoa do Congro
Lagoa do Canário
Lagoa Empadadas
Lagoa de Pau Pique
Lagoa do Carvão
Lagoa de São Brás
Lagoa do Areeiro
Lagoa dos Nenúfares
Lagoa do Peixe
Lagoa do Charco da Madeira
Lagoa das Canas
Lagoa da Prata
Lagoa das Achadas
Lagoa do Caldeirão Grande
Lagoa do Caldeirão Norte
Lagoa do Junco

São Jorge Island
Lagoa da Fajã de Santo Cristo
Lagoa da Fajã dos Cubres
Lagoa do Pico do Bernardino
Lagoa do Pico Alto
Lagoa do Pico da Esperança
Lagoa do Pico Pinheiro

Mainland

Serra da Estrela

Lagoa dos Cântaros
Lagoa Comprida
Covão dos Conchos
Lagoa do Covão do Quelhas
Lagoa da Francelha
Covão do Meio
Lagoa do Peixão
Lagoa Serrano
Lago do Viriato

Peneda-Gerês

Vilarinho das Furnas Dam

See also
 

Portugal
Lakes